WNSB is an Urban Alternative formatted broadcast radio station licensed to Norfolk, Virginia, serving Hampton Roads.  WNSB is owned and operated by Norfolk State University.

WNSB is licensed by the FCC to broadcast in the HD Radio (hybrid) format.

Under the guidance of Mike Henry's Paragon Media Strategies, WNSB segued from Mainstream Urban to Urban Alternative on July 10, 2019.

References

External links
 Hot 91 Online
 

1980 establishments in Virginia
Mainstream urban radio stations in the United States
Radio stations established in 1980
NSB
NSB